Pyrenula muriciliata is a species of corticolous (bark-dwelling) and crustose lichen in the family Pyrenulaceae. It is found in Mauritius, where it grows on tree bark in parklands and forests.

Taxonomy
Pyrenula muriciliata it was formally described as a new species in 2020 by Paul Diederich and Damien Ertz.

Description
The lichen has a thin, brownish to greyish brown to thallus (lacking a cortex with a medium to dark brown prothallus. The photobiont partner is a green alga from the genus Trentepohlia. The lichen's perithecia are 0.5–0.7 mm wide, and have an ostiole to release spores. The ascospores are ellipsoid in shape, and muriform—meaning they have 3 transverse walls dividing the spore into chambers; additionally, the ends of the spore are rounded, and each has a cilium at its base. The specific epithet muriciliata refers to these characteristic spore features.

All chemical spot tests are negative, and no secondary compounds were detected with thin-layer chromatography.

See also
List of Pyrenula species

References

muriciliata
Lichen species
Lichens described in 2020
Lichens of Mauritius